The Silenced is a 2015 South Korean mystery-thriller film written and directed by Lee Hae-young, starring Park Bo-young and Uhm Ji-won.

Plot
Set in Gyeongseong in 1938 during the Japanese occupation, the film centers on Ju-ran/ Shizuko (Park Bo-young), a sickly young girl who gets transferred to a sanatorium/girls' boarding school to recover her health. Her physical condition improves thanks to her new friend Yeon-deok, and the headmistress' special treatment program. But she soon notices that students are disappearing one by one and that her own body is undergoing abnormal changes. Determined to uncover the truth, Ju-ran starts to investigate the mysterious happenings and the school's possible role in them.

Shizuko begins seeing a couple of her classmates in terrible positions; bleeding out or having severe seizures. The school denies that anything unusual is happening in an effort to convince Shizuko that it is all in her head. After being confronted by her classmate Yuka, Shizuko snaps and in a violent rage almost strangles Yuka to death with a single hand showing incredible strength. Shizuko does not understand what is happening to her or to the other girls in the school and with the help of Yeon-deok, who now recalls other horrors from her time there, decides to investigate by breaking into the headmistress' office. While in the headmistress' office, they overhear an argument between her and a young man dressed in a Japanese military uniform. The argument is about a new drug and apparently losing test subjects, referring to Shizuko's disappearing classmates. When the headmistress and the soldier leave the office, Shizuko and Yeon-deok continue their snooping eventually finding an experiment proposal written in Japanese describing a performance-enhancing drug that aims to alter the human condition making the subjects super strong but also heightening their emotions and causing many adverse side-effects. This reveals that The Imperial Japan is using the girls as lab rats to create drugs to enhance performance of Japanese troops against the allies. Shizuko and Yeon-deok also find movies of themselves and a previous cohort that demonstrate the effects of the drug. The two students then hear a commotion outside culminating in the attempted suicide of Yuka. In the ensuing chaos they try to escape the school by running into the forest, only to find that they are at the edge of a massive Japanese military base. Shizuko and Yeon-deok are then captured by Japanese commander and brought back to the facility.

The Japanese commander states to the principal that he will take over the experimentation from now, much to her dismay. Yeon-deok drowned in a tank, causing Shizuko to wake up after hearing her screams. Shizuko then goes on a rampage and kills all the Japanese soldiers at the facility. The councilor is brutalized by the girls as Shizuko tells them about everything. The principal tries to kill Shizuko but hits the water tank with Yeon-deok in it. Shizuko, distraught at her friend's demise, throws the principal at a spike hanging on the wall, which kills her. Shizuko then proceeds to attack the Japanese base in a fit of rage.

Cast
Park Bo-young as Cha Ju-ran / Shizuko
Uhm Ji-won as Headmistress Kato Sanae
Park So-dam as Hong Yeon-deok / Kazue
Kong Ye-ji as Yuka
Joo Bo-bi as Kihira
Shim Hee-seop as Kenji
Park Sung-yeon as Life teacher
Ko Won-hee as Shizuko

Box office
The Silenced was released on June 18, 2015. It opened at third place, grossing  from 258,000 admissions in its first four days.

Awards and nominations

References

External links

2010s mystery thriller films
South Korean mystery thriller films
2015 films
Films set in Korea under Japanese rule
Films directed by Lee Hae-young
Lotte Entertainment films
2010s South Korean films